Serra do Morião, also known as Serra da Nasce Água is a mountain in the Azores. It is located in Angra do Heroísmo, on the island of Terceira.

It is located at 632 meters above sea level. It contains what is possibly the island's largest reservoir, located in the crater of an ancient volcano.

References

Angra do Heroísmo
Mountain ranges of Portugal